Leonid Aleksandrovich Kmit (born Aleksei Aleksandrovich Kmita; ; 9 March 1908 – 11 March 1982) was a Soviet and Russian actor. In 1931 he graduated from Saint Petersburg State Theatre Arts Academy (SPbGATI), where he studied in the acting class of Yevgeny Chervyakov. In 1936 he was invited to join the Russian Army Theatre's company. In 1957 he became an actor of the Screen Actors Theater in Moscow.

Kmit performed in more than thirty films from 1929 to 1982. He is best known for his performance as Petka in Chapaev.

Selected filmography

External links

1908 births
1982 deaths
20th-century Russian male actors
Honored Artists of the RSFSR
People's Artists of the RSFSR
Russian male film actors
Soviet male film actors
Burials at Kuntsevo Cemetery